is a private university in Yao, Osaka, Japan, established in 1971.

Organizations 
This university has the following organizations.

Faculties and Departments

Faculty of Economics 

 Department of Economics
 Global Economy Course
 Policy and Management Course
 Monetary Economy Course
 Regional Economy Course

Faculty of Business Administration 

 Department of Business Administration
 Accounting and Finance Course
 Organization / Human Resource Management Course
 Planning Marketing Course
 Business Management Course

Faculty of Law 

 Legal Professionals Course
 Public Officials Course
 Contemporary Society & Career Course
 International Relations Course

Faculty of International Studies 

 The International Communication Course
 The International Interchange / Public Service Model
 The Tourism and Hospitality Model
 The English Professional Model
 The Global Career Course
 The Private Enterprise / International Business Management Model
 The International Commerce Model
 The International Cooperation Model

References

External links
 Official website

Educational institutions established in 1971
Private universities and colleges in Japan
Universities and colleges in Osaka Prefecture
Kansai Collegiate American Football League

Yao, Osaka